Morphodexia is a genus of parasitic flies in the family Tachinidae. There are about six described species in Morphodexia.

Species
Morphodexia barrosi (Brèthes, 1919)
Morphodexia burmanica (Baranov, 1938)
Morphodexia clausa Aldrich, 1934
Morphodexia facialis (Aldrich, 1928)
Morphodexia nigra Aldrich, 1934
Morphodexia palpalis Aldrich, 1934
Morphodexia subaenea Aldrich, 1934

References

Dexiinae
Diptera of South America
Tachinidae genera
Taxa named by Charles Henry Tyler Townsend